Henry Macwilliam (c. 1532 – 1586) was a member of Parliament for Dorchester (1571), Liskeard (1572), Appleby (1584) and Carlisle (1586).

He was the son of Henry Macwilliam and Elizabeth Leyes.

His home was Stambourne Hall, Essex. He became Keeper of Colchester Castle.

He was first married to Elizabeth Leyes, daughter of Sir John Leyes. 

He married a second time to Mary Cheke, a widowed lady of the queen's privy chamber.

He died on 27 December 1586. His children included:
 Henry Macwillian (d. 1599)
 Margaret Macwilliam, married Sir John Stanhope (d. 1621)
 Susannah Macwilliam, married Edward Saunders, (2) Goddard Pemberton

References

1530s births
Year of birth uncertain
1586 deaths
Members of the Parliament of England for Dorchester
English MPs 1571
People from Braintree District
English MPs 1572–1583
English MPs 1584–1585
English MPs 1586–1587
Members of the Parliament of England (pre-1707) for Liskeard
Members of the Parliament of England (pre-1707) for Appleby
Members of the Parliament of England (pre-1707) for Carlisle